Bapatla is a constituency in Bapatla district of Andhra Pradesh, representing the state legislative assembly in India. As per the Delimitation Orders (2008), the constituency covers Bapatla mandal, Pittalavanipalem mandal and Karlapalem mandals. It is one of the seven assembly segments of Bapatla (SC) (Lok Sabha constituency), along with Vemuru Repalle, Parchur, Addanki, Chirala and Santhanuthalapadu. Kona Raghupathi is the present MLA of the constituency, who won the 2019 Andhra Pradesh Legislative Assembly election from YSR Congress Party. As of 25 March 2019, there are a total of 183,917 electors in the constituency.

Mandals

Members of legislative assembly 

Kona Raghupathi is the present MLA of the constituency representing the YSR Congress Party. He defeated Annam Satish Prabhakar of Telugu Desam Party in the 2014 Andhra Pradesh Assembly Elections.

Assembly elections 2019

Assembly elections 2014

Assembly elections 2009

Assembly elections 2004

Assembly elections 1999

Assembly elections 1994

Assembly elections 1989

Assembly elections 1985

Assembly elections 1983

Assembly elections 1978

Assembly elections 1972

Assembly elections 1967

Assembly elections 1962
			

		

			

Source: Constituency results

Assembly elections 1955

Assembly elections 1952

See also
 List of constituencies of Andhra Pradesh Legislative Assembly

References

Further reading
 

Assembly constituencies of Andhra Pradesh